Sarah Fay Wright Olsen (born September 28, 1983) is an American actress. She played Millicent Gergich in a recurring role on Parks and Recreation.

Career
Wright began her acting career at an early age. When she was 14 years old she became a model and soon after, she appeared in a minor role in the 1998 comedy Enchanted. She played the character of Paige Chase in the sitcom Quintuplets. She co-starred in the sitcom The Loop as Lizzy. She also played the recurring role of Jane on the CW series 7th Heaven. In 2011, Wright began a recurring role in the CBS mid-season replacement comedy series Mad Love and maintained a small recurring role as Millicent Gergich on the NBC show Parks and Recreation.

In 2017, Wright co-starred alongside Tom Cruise in the action crime film American Made as Lucy Seal. She had a major role in the Netflix show Spinning Out, which aired January 1, 2020.

Personal life
Wright was born on September 28, 1983, in Louisville, Kentucky. She graduated from Seneca High School and married A. J. Mason in 2005; they divorced in 2006.

In 2011, on an episode of The Talk, Wright announced her engagement to actor Eric Christian Olsen. They were married near Jackson Hole, Wyoming, on June 23, 2012. Their children are son Wyatt Oliver Olsen (born 2013) and daughters Esme Olivia Olsen (born 2016) and Winter Story Olsen (born in 2020).

Olsen and actress Teresa Palmer co-founded the parenting site Your Zen Mama and co-authored the book Zen Mamas: Finding Your Path Through Pregnancy, Birth and Beyond in 2021.

Filmography

Film

Television

References

External links
 

1983 births
Living people
20th-century American actresses
21st-century American actresses
Actresses from Louisville, Kentucky
Female models from Kentucky
American film actresses
American television actresses